Dylan Scott is the debut studio album by the American country music singer of the same name. It was released on August 12, 2016, by Curb Records. The album features the single "My Girl", which was a number one hit on the Billboard Country Airplay chart. The album was re-released on August 4, 2017 with three new songs added.

Content
Scott co-wrote seven of the album's 13 tracks, including its first three singles. "Lay It on Me" was released in November 2014 as the first single from the album, though it failed to chart. "Crazy Over Me" was released as the second single in October 2015 and managed to become Scott's first top 40 hit on both the Billboard Country Airplay and Hot Country Songs charts. The third single, "My Girl," was released in July 2016 and became his first number one hit on the Billboard Country Airplay chart, while also reaching the top 40 of the Billboard Hot 100''.

The album was reissued on August 4, 2017, as a deluxe edition, with three new songs included. "Hooked" was released as the album's fourth single and became Scott's second top 20 hit on the Country Airplay charts. The other two new songs were "Sleeping Beauty" and "Can't Take Her Anywhere."

Commercial performance
The album debuted on the US Billboard 200 at number 46, and the Top Country Albums chart at number five, with 9,000 copies sold in the US in its first week. The album has sold 55,400 copies in the US as of January 2018.

Track listing

Personnel
Adapted from AllMusic

Matt Alderman – acoustic guitar, programming, background vocals
Stephen Barker Lyles – background vocals
Tom Bukovac – electric guitar
Darrick Cline – drums
Garrett Cline – bass guitar
Perry Coleman – background vocals
Curt Gibbs – acoustic guitar, electric guitar, programming
Dan Dugmore – steel guitar
Josue Meza Garcia – keyboards, piano
Eric Gunderson – background vocals
Tommy Harden – drums
Mark Hill – bass guitar
Jillian Jacqueline – background vocals
Mike Johnson – steel guitar
Jeff King – electric guitar
Troy Lancaster – electric guitar
Josh Matheny – dobro
Pat McGrath – acoustic guitar
Jerry McPherson – electric guitar
Russ Pahl – steel guitar
Brent Rader – banjo, acoustic guitar, mandolin
Logan Robinson – acoustic guitar, electric guitar
Chris Rodriguez – electric guitar
Mike Rojas – Hammond B-3 organ, keyboards
Scotty Sanders – steel guitar
Dylan Scott – electric guitar, lead vocals, background vocals
Jason Webb – keyboards

Charts

Weekly charts

Year-end charts

Certifications

References

2016 debut albums
Dylan Scott albums
Curb Records albums